The square bifrustum or square truncated bipyramid is the second in an infinite series of bifrustum polyhedra. It has 4 trapezoidal and 2 square faces.

This polyhedron can be constructed by taking a square bipyramid (octahedron) and truncating the polar axis vertices, making it into two end-to-end frustums.

It is dual to the elongated square dipyramid.
Polyhedra